Battlefords—Lloydminster is a federal electoral district in Saskatchewan, Canada, that has been represented in the House of Commons of Canada since 1997.

Geography
The district is in Central-Western Saskatchewan. It includes the communities of North Battleford, Battleford and Unity; as well as the Saskatchewan portion of Lloydminster.

Demographics
According to the Canada 2011 Census

Ethnic groups: 74.7% White, 22.2% Indigenous, 1.6% Filipino, 1.5% Other
Languages: 87.4% English, 4.5% Cree, 2.5% German, 1.4% French, 1.0% Tagalog, 3.2% Other
Religions: 71.4% Christian, 3.6% Traditional (Aboriginal) Spirituality, 0.8% Other, 24.2% None
Median income: $29,976 (2010) 
Average income: $37,724 (2010)

History
The electoral district was created in 1996 from Kindersley—Lloydminster and The Battlefords—Meadow Lake ridings.

This riding lost territory to Cypress Hills—Grasslands and gained a fraction of territory from Saskatoon—Rosetown—Biggar during the 2012 electoral redistribution.

Members of Parliament
The riding has been represented by Rosemarie Falk since 2017. It has elected the following member of the House of Commons of Canada:

Election results

On 5 November 2017, Prime Minister Justin Trudeau announced a by-election will be held on December 11, 2017.

See also
 List of Canadian federal electoral districts
 Past Canadian electoral districts

References

Notes

External links
 
 Expenditures - 2008
 Expenditures - 2004
 Expenditures - 2000
 Expenditures - 1997

Saskatchewan federal electoral districts
Lloydminster
North Battleford